Macrocheilus cruciatus is a species of ground beetle in the subfamily Anthiinae. It was described by Marc in 1840.

References

Anthiinae (beetle)
Beetles described in 1840